Joyce Choong Wai Chi (born 20 December 1995) is a Malaysian-born badminton player and currently representing Australia.

Achievements

Oceania Championships 
Women's doubles

BWF International Challenge/Series (4 runners-up) 
Women's doubles

  BWF International Challenge tournament
  BWF International Series tournament
  BWF Future Series tournament

References

External links 
 

1995 births
Living people
Sportspeople from Penang
Malaysian female badminton players
Australian female badminton players
Malaysian emigrants to Australia
Malaysian sportspeople of Chinese descent